Iler may refer to:

 Iler, Algeria, a town in Algeria
 Iler, Ohio, a community in the United States
 Frank Iler (born 1942), politician
 Robert Iler (born 1985), actor